Dorchester South railway station is one of two stations serving the town of Dorchester in Dorset, England, the other one being Dorchester West. The station is on the South West Main Line. The station is managed by South Western Railway, who operate all trains serving it.

History 

The station opened on 1 June 1847 when the Southampton and Dorchester Railway was completed. The station was built as an east facing terminus with the intent of continuing the line westwards towards Exeter. These plans were never realised, and instead another line was built from the terminus towards Weymouth. This joined with the Great Western Railway's line (now the Heart of Wessex Line) from Dorchester West and continued as a joint line to Weymouth.

Originally named Dorchester, the station was renamed Dorchester South on 26 September 1949. The station remained a terminus with trains from Bournemouth having to enter the station, reverse out back the way they came then reverse again and proceed to Weymouth. Trains from Weymouth had to pass the station, then reverse into it, and then back out. This process often caused delays and brought criticism following an accident in 1877. As a result, a curved platform was provided for southbound trains; this was brought into use during 1878. Eastbound trains still reversed into the original platform until 1970 when a platform was built on the curve. The buildings on the trackless original platform remained in use until 1989. As part of the modernisation work preparatory to electrification a new booking hall was built on the curved platform, replacing the building on the original platform which was then demolished.

Stationmasters

W. Mears ca. 1873 - 1881
J.C. Holiday 1881 - 1893 (formerly station master at Ringwood)
H.J. Smith 1893 - 1898
George Hart 1898 - 1907 (formerly station master at Wimborne)
A. Pearce 1908 - 1909 (formerly station master at Tavistock, afterwards station master of Bournemouth West)
Charles William Eve 1909 - 1911 (afterwards station master at Bournemouth West)
S.H. Smith 1911 - 1923 (formerly station master at Wimborne)
William John Liley 1923 - 1928 (formerly station master at Brockenhurst)
Percival George Collins 1928 - 1930 (afterwards station master at Eastbourne)
H.M. Wood 1930 - 1942 (from 1932 also station master of Dorchester West)
John Charles Leach 1942 - 1945 (also in charge of Dorchester West)
S.A. Smith from 1945 (formerly station master at Winchester and Shawford, also in charge of Dorchester West)

Motive power depot
The Southampton and Dorchester Railway constructed a motive power depot at the station in 1847 together with a coal stage and turntable. This closed in 1957 and was demolished soon afterwards.

Modernisation 
During late 2010/early 2011, CCTV monitor podiums were installed on platform 1 (similar to those used on the London Underground) so as to allow the guards of each London-bound train to have easier visuals of the platforms (because platform 1 has a tight curve, and makes it difficult to see the length of the platform whilst a train is in the vicinity of the station). 
New entrances have also been constructed from the southern end of platform 1 to the adjacent car park, as well as new waiting shelters built near the new entrance and on the site of the former brick hut on platform 2.

Services 

All services at Dorchester South are operated by South Western Railway.

The second is a semi-fast service calling at principal stations only northbound to Winchester, then  and London Waterloo. Southbound, this service runs non-stop to Weymouth.

On Sundays, the service is reduced to hourly in each direction.

A less frequent service is also available from the nearby Dorchester West station, which is served by Great Western Railway, with trains heading towards Westbury, Bristol Temple Meads and Gloucester.

Notes

References
References

Sources

External links

South
Railway stations in Great Britain opened in 1847
Former London and South Western Railway stations
Railway stations served by South Western Railway
1847 establishments in England
DfT Category D stations